Karl Gustaf Lennart Lindroos (December 2, 1886 – July 26, 1921) was a Finnish breaststroke swimmer who competed in the 1912 Summer Olympics. He was born in Helsinki. In 1912 he was eliminated in the semi-finals of the 200 metre breaststroke event as well as in the semi-finals of the 400 metre breaststroke competition.

References

External links
Lennart Lindroos' profile at Sports Reference.com
Lennart Lindroos' obituary 

1886 births
1921 deaths
Swimmers from Helsinki
Finnish male breaststroke swimmers
Olympic swimmers of Finland
Swimmers at the 1912 Summer Olympics